is a Japanese former professional footballer who played as a midfielder. He played for the Japan national team.

Club career
Morishima was born in Hiroshima on April 30, 1972. After graduating from high school, he joined Japan Soccer League club Yanmar Diesel (later Cerezo Osaka) in 1991. In 1992, Japan Soccer League was folded and the club joined new league Japan Football League. The club won the champions in 1994 and was promoted to J1 League. The club won the 2nd place at 2001 and 2003 Emperor's Cup. His opportunity to play decreased from 2007 and he retired end of 2008 season. He played 456 games and scored 140 goals for the club.

International career
On May 21, 1995, Morishima debuted for Japan national team against Scotland. In 1996, played at 1996 AFC Asian Cup. At 1998 World Cup qualification in 1997, Japan won the qualify for 1998 FIFA World Cup first time Japan's history. At 1998 World Cup, he got 11 minutes as a substitute against Croatia.

In 2000, Morishima played at 2000 AFC Asian Cup. he played five matches and Japan won the champions. In 2001, he played at 2001 FIFA Confederations Cup. He played in all five matches and Japan reached second place. At the 2002 FIFA World Cup he got three games as a substitute, scoring after two minutes in the game against Tunisia. He played 64 games and scored 12 goals for Japan until 2002.

Career statistics

Club

International

Scores and results list Japan's goal tally first, score column indicates score after each Morishima goal.

Honors
Japan
 FIFA Confederations Cup runner-up: 2001
 AFC Asian Cup: 2000

Individual
 J1 League Best Eleven: 1995, 2000

References

External links
 
 
 Japan National Football Team Database
 

1972 births
Living people
Association football people from Hiroshima Prefecture
Japanese footballers
Japan international footballers
Japan Soccer League players
J1 League players
J2 League players
Japan Football League (1992–1998) players
Cerezo Osaka players
1996 AFC Asian Cup players
1998 FIFA World Cup players
2000 AFC Asian Cup players
2001 FIFA Confederations Cup players
2002 FIFA World Cup players
AFC Asian Cup-winning players
Association football midfielders